The Thomas T and Wesley B Frasier Houses in Brookside, Ohio were built in the 19th century along Route 40. The houses were added to the National Register on 1982-11-17.

The house located at 920 National Road is currently used as Wilson Funeral Home, owned and operated by U.S. Congressman Charlie Wilson, while the house at 898 National Road is used as the private residence of Ohio State Senator Jason Wilson.

References

Houses in Belmont County, Ohio
National Register of Historic Places in Belmont County, Ohio
Houses on the National Register of Historic Places in Ohio